The president of Serbia, officially styled as the President of the Republic is the head of state of Serbia.

The current office holder is Aleksandar Vučić. He was elected on 2 April 2017 and took office on 31 May 2017.
The list includes the heads of state of the Socialist Republic of Serbia, a constituent country of the Socialist Federal Republic of Yugoslavia and heads of state of the Republic of Serbia (1992–2006), a constituent country of the Federal Republic of Yugoslavia and State Union of Serbia and Montenegro. Prior to 1974, Serbia's head of state was the speaker of the Serbian parliament.

The president is directly elected to a five-year term and is limited by the Constitution to a maximum of two terms. In addition to being the commander-in-chief of the Armed Forces, the president has the procedural duty of appointing the prime minister with the consent of the National Assembly, and has some influence on foreign policy. The president's office is located in Novi Dvor.

Duties and competences
Largely a ceremonial position, the duties and competences of the president as stipulated in chapter 5, article 112 of the Constitution:

 Represent Serbia at home and abroad,
 Proclaim laws upon their decree, in accordance with the Constitution,
 Propose an individual for the position of Prime Minister to Parliament,
 Propose to the National Assembly holders of positions, in accordance with the Constitution
 Appoint and dismiss, upon their decree, ambassadors of Serbia, upon the proposal of the Government,
 Receive letters of credit and revocable letters of credit of foreign diplomatic representatives,
 Grant amnesties and award honors,
 Administer other affairs stipulated by the Constitution.
In accordance with the law, the president of the republic shall command the Army and appoint, promote and relieve officers of the Army of Serbia.

Oath of office
While assuming the office, the president of the republic shall take the following oath before the National Assembly:

Term of office
The term of office of the president of the republic shall last five years and begin from the day of taking of the oath before the National Assembly.

If the term of office of the president of the republic expires during the state of war or emergency, it shall be extended so that it lasts until the expiry of three months from the day of the end of the state of war, that is, of emergency.

No one shall be elected to a position of the president of the republic more than twice.

The term of office of the president of the republic shall end with expiry of the period of time for which they have been elected, by their resignation, or released of duty.

The president of the republic shall tender their resignation to the president of the National Assembly.

Support staff
Advisers to the president carry out the analytical, advisory and other corresponding tasks for the needs of the president of the republic as well as other expert tasks in relations of the president with the Government and the Parliament.

Additional posts connected to the office of the president include:

• Chief of staff to the president of the republic.

• Secretary-general to the president of the republic, who presides over the secretariat of the president of the republic

List of presidents

Latest elections

See also

 List of presidents of Serbia
 Politics of Serbia
 Prime Minister of Serbia

References

External links
 Official website of the President of Serbia
 People´s Office of the President

 
Politics of Serbia
 
1991 establishments in Serbia